In probability theory, Yan's theorem is a separation and existence result. It is of particular interest in financial mathematics where one uses it to prove the Kreps-Yan theorem.

The theorem was published by Jia-An Yan. It was proven for the L1 space and later generalized by Jean-Pascal Ansel to the case .

Yan's theorem 
Notation:
 is the closure of a set .
.

Statement 
Let  be a probability space,  and  be the space of non-negative and bounded random variables.

Then the following three conditions are equivalent:
 For all  with  exists a constant , such that .
 For all  with  exists a constant , such that .
 There exists a random variable , such that  almost surely and 
.

Literature 
 
 Freddy Delbaen and Walter Schachermayer: The Mathematics of Arbitrage (2005). Springer Finance

References 

Probability